Nova Vas is a small village in the Municipality of Miren-Kostanjevica in the Littoral region of Slovenia next to the border with Italy.

The local church is dedicated to Saint Sylvester and belongs to the Parish of Opatje Selo.

References

External links
Nova Vas on Geopedia

Populated places in the Municipality of Miren-Kostanjevica